Shi Taifeng (born September 1956) is a Chinese politician currently serving as the head of the United Front Work Department of the Chinese Communist Party, a member of the Politburo of the Chinese Communist Party, and a secretary of the Secretariat of the Chinese Communist Party. He previously served as the President of the Chinese Academy of Social Sciences in 2022. Originally from Shanxi province, Shi spent part of his career at the Central Party School. He has also served as the Communist Party Secretary of Suzhou, the Deputy Party Secretary, the Governor of Jiangsu province, the Communist Party Secretary of the Ningxia Hui Autonomous Region, and the Communist Party Secretary of Inner Mongolia Autonomous Region.

Biography
Shi Taifeng was born in Yushe County, Shanxi, in 1956.  During the Cultural Revolution he was a sent-down youth in his home county, performing manual labour.  He then studied machinery at a local college before entering the work force as a factory worker.  Following the resumption of the National College Entrance Exams, Shi was admitted to Peking University and obtained a master's degree in law.  He was classmates with Li Keqiang, who later became Premier.  After graduation, he served as a political instructor at the Central Party School.

He worked as the deputy party chief of Jin County, Hebei, before joining the research office of the Central Party School, then heading the Organization Department of the school. He spent about a year studying abroad at the University of Amsterdam in the Netherlands. In July 2001, Shi was named vice president of the Central Party School.

In 2008, Shi became a member of the Standing Committee of the National People's Congress, a member of the Law Committee of the NPC.  In September 2010 he joined the provincial Party Standing Committee and became head of the Organization Department of the Jiangsu party organization.  He subsequently was elevated to deputy party chief of Jiangsu province. In June 2014 he began serving concurrently as the party chief of Suzhou, an important city on the Yangtze River Delta and an area of high concentration for manufacturing and foreign investment. During this time it was said that Shi honed his credentials as 'first-in-charge' of a major city, in preparation for his taking higher office. In December 2015, after a series of consultative meetings, Shi Taifeng was elevated to acting Governor of Jiangsu province, replacing Li Xueyong, who retired due to age. He was duly confirmed as governor by a full session of the provincial People's Congress on January 28, 2016. In April 2017, Shi appointed as the Communist Party Secretary of the Ningxia Hui Autonomous Region.

In October 2019, Shi was appointed as the Communist Party Secretary of Inner Mongolia Autonomous Region. In May 2022, he was appointed as the president and party secretary of the Chinese Academy of Social Sciences, succeeding Xie Fuzhan.

Shi is an alternate member of the 18th Central Committee of the Chinese Communist Party.

References

1956 births
Living people
People's Republic of China politicians from Shanxi
Chinese Communist Party politicians from Shanxi
Governors of Jiangsu
Peking University alumni
Vice-governors of Jiangsu
Political office-holders in Ningxia
Political office-holders in Inner Mongolia
People from Yushe County
Alternate members of the 18th Central Committee of the Chinese Communist Party
Members of the 19th Central Committee of the Chinese Communist Party
Members of the 20th Politburo of the Chinese Communist Party
Politicians from Jinzhong
Delegates to the 11th National People's Congress
Delegates to the 12th National People's Congress
Members of the Standing Committee of the 11th National People's Congress